Bruno Cunha Cantanhede (born 22 July 1993) is a Brazilian professional footballer who plays as a forward for V.League 1 club Dong A Thanh Hoa.

Honours
Hapoel Kiryat Shmona
Israel Super Cup: 2015

Individual
V.League 1 Top goalscorer: 2019

References

External links
  
 

1993 births
Living people
Brazilian footballers
São Paulo FC players
Esporte Clube Noroeste players
Paulista Futebol Clube players
Rio Claro Futebol Clube players
Hapoel Ironi Kiryat Shmona F.C. players
C.D. Tondela players
Paraná Clube players
Daejeon Hana Citizen FC players
FC Anyang players
Viettel FC players
Hanoi FC players
Persib Bandung players
Israeli Premier League players
Primeira Liga players
K League 2 players
V.League 1 players
Liga 1 (Indonesia) players
Brazilian expatriate footballers
Expatriate footballers in Israel
Expatriate footballers in Portugal
Expatriate footballers in South Korea
Expatriate footballers in Vietnam
Expatriate footballers in Indonesia
Brazilian expatriate sportspeople in Israel
Brazilian expatriate sportspeople in Portugal
Brazilian expatriate sportspeople in South Korea
Brazilian expatriate sportspeople in Vietnam
Brazilian expatriate sportspeople in Indonesia
Association football forwards
People from São Luís, Maranhão
Sportspeople from Maranhão